This is a list of historic schools of forestry, by founding date. Also included is information about each school's location, founder(s), present status, and (where applicable) closing date. Many remain active.

1700s
 1778 - A course of study in forestry formally added to the curriculum at the University of Giessen, Hesse-Darmstadt, Holy Roman Empire
 1785 - Master school of forestry established by Heinrich von Cotta and his father, in Kleine Zillbach, near Wasungen, Thuringia
 1787 or 1789 - Master school of forestry established at Hungen, Hesse, by Georg Ludwig Hartig; moved to Dillenburg, Hesse, 1797–1805; reestablished in Berlin; then, in 1830, moved to Eberswalde, about 30 km away (see below)
 1790 - School of forestry established in Munich, Bavaria
 1798 - Waldau Forest Institute (Forstlehranstalt zu Waldau) established by Friedrich Ludwig von Witzelben, in the Kassel district of Hesse, Germany; closed 1815

1800-1849 

 1800 - First formal training of foresters in Russia; 'forstmeister' course established at the Naval Cadet Corps Academy, Saint Petersburg
 1803 - Royal Forestry School (or 'Practical Forestry School'), in Tsarskoye Selo (near Saint Petersburg), Russia; in 1811 moved to the imperial capital to become the Imperial Forestry Institute, later the S. M. Kirov Forestry Academy; today the Saint Petersburg State Forest Technical University.
 1807 - Royal Bavarian Central Forestry Academy, Aschaffenburg, Bavaria; merged with the University of Munich in 1874

 1807 - Forestry Institute, Academy of Mining, Schemnitz, Austria-Hungary (now Banská Štiavnica, Slovakia; Heinrich David Wilckens, founder); became the Academy of Mining and Forestry, 1848 (Ignaz Schwarz Friedrich, founder); moved to Sopron, Hungary, in 1919; continues today as the University of West Hungary.
 1811 - Royal Saxon Academy of Forestry, Tharandt, Saxony (Heinrich von Cotta, founder); now part of Dresden University of Technology, Germany
 1811 - Royal Swedish Academy of Agriculture and Forestry, Stockholm (Karl XIV Johan, founder)
 1813 - Imperial Academy of Forestry, at the Mariabrunn monastery, near Vienna, Austria
 1824 - French National School of Forestry (École nationale des eaux et forêts, or 'Imperial Forestry School'), Nancy, France; today part of AgroParisTech

 1830 - Royal Prussian Higher Forestry College established in Eberswalde; later affiliated as a faculty of the University of Berlin; the International Union of Forest Experiment Stations, predecessor of the International Union of Forest Research Organizations, was established there on August 17, 1892.
 1844 - Escuela Técnica Superior de Ingenieros de Montes, Madrid, Spain, continuing today in the Technical University of Madrid
 1848 - School of forestry established at Turin, Italy

1850-1899 
 1860 - Royal Agriculture and Forestry College, Križevci, Croatia; today the College of Agriculture at Križevci
 1868 - Faculty of Forest Sciences and Forest Ecology, University of Göttingen, Lower Saxony, Germany; successor to the Royal Prussian Academy of Forestry at Münden
 1870 - Forest Institute of Vallombrosa, Italy, established on the German model
 1875 - Forestry program established at the University of Agriculture in Vienna, Austria, incorporating the former Imperial Academy of Forestry at Mariabrunn
 1878 - Imperial Forest School, Dehradun, India (founded by Dietrich Brandis, for the British Imperial Forestry Service); today, incorporated into the Indian Forest Research Institute, Dehradun

 1885 - Royal Indian Engineering College (also known informally as the 'Cooper's Hill School of Forestry'), Surrey, England (William Schlich, founder); closed 1905
 1897 - Forestry programs included in the Faculty of Agriculture, in the newly established Kyoto Imperial University, now Kyoto University, Japan
 1898, September 1 - Biltmore Forest School, Asheville, North Carolina, USA (Carl A. Schenck, founder); closed 1913
 1898, September 22 or 23 - New York State College of Forestry at Cornell, Ithaca, NY, USA (Bernhard Fernow, founding dean); closed June 1903
 1898, October 20 - Academy of Forestry established at the University of Zagreb, Croatia

1900-1949 

 1900 - Yale School of Forestry, New Haven, Connecticut, USA (Gifford Pinchot, founder; Henry S. Graves, founding dean)
 1902 - Agriculture and Forestry School, Shanxi Province, China
 1903 - Forestry department, Imperial University of Peking, China
 1903, May - Pennsylvania State Forest Academy, Mont Alto, PA (Joseph Rothrock, MD, founder; George Wirt, founding administrator); merged with the Pennsylvania State University to become Penn State Mont Alto
 1904 - Forestry department, Zhili Higher Agricultural School, Hebei Province, China; in 1952, the department was separated into several universities, with most faculty going into the Beijing Forestry University
 1905 - School of Forestry, Oxford University, England (Sir William Schlich, founder)
 1906 - School of Forestry, University of Georgia, (George Foster Peabody, founder; Alfred A. Akerman, founding dean)
 1906 - South African Forestry School, Tokai, Cape Town, South Africa (Joseph Storr Lister, founder)
 1907 - Faculty of Forestry, University of Toronto, Canada (Bernhard Fernow, founding dean)
 1907 - School of Forestry, University of Washington, Seattle, WA (Francis Miller, first dean)
 1908 - Ranger School, University of Montana
 1910, April 19 - Forest School established within the College of Agriculture at the University of the Philippines Los Baños, Royal F. Nash, founding "Officer-in-Charge"; today the College of Forestry and Natural Resources
 1910 - Victorian School of Forestry (VSF), Creswick, Australia.
 1911 - New York State College of Forestry at Syracuse University, Syracuse, NY, USA; (Louis Marshall, founder; William L. Bray, founding dean); now part of the State University of New York system

 1912 - Madras Forest Academy, Coimbatore, Tamil Nadu, South India
 1913 - School of Forestry, University of Montana. Established by the 12th Legislature of Montana.
 1919 - Moscow Forest Engineering Institute, Russia's "first higher education institution for training forest engineers"; now Moscow State Forest University
 1920 - Faculty of Forestry, University of Belgrade, Serbia. Studies in the field of forestry began in 1920 as the Department of Forestry at the Agricultural Faculty in Belgrade. The Faculty of Forestry became separate in 1949, the first independent forestry faculty in the former Yugoslavia.
 1926 - Australian Forestry School, Canberra, Australia. Foundation Principal Charles Lane Poole. Became part of the Australian National University in 1965.
 1932 - Saasveld College for Foresters, George, South Africa; now part of Nelson Mandela Metropolitan University (NMMU)
 1948, June 16 - Forestry Specialist School, Shanxi Province, China (established by the Chinese Communist Party)

1950-present
 1951 - University of British Columbia, Vancouver, British Columbia, established its Faculty of Forestry.  The school would absorb students from Hungary's Sopron School in 1957.
 1952 - Beijing Forestry University, China, with faculty from Tsinghua University, Peking University, and the Beijing Agricultural University
 1962 - Forestry school established in Viçosa, Minas Gerais, Brazil, with support from the United Nations Development Program, the Food and Agriculture Organization, and the Government of Brazil; moved the next year to become a faculty of the Federal University of Paraná, in Curitiba.
 1976 - Institute of Forestry established in the Faculty of Science, University of Chittagong, Bangladesh, with help of Ministry of Environment and Forest and Bangladesh Forest Department. It is the pioneer institution of the country which initiated Professional Master of Forestry in 1977–78; 4-year B.Sc. (Hons.) in Forestry in 1978–79; M.Sc. in Forestry in 1996; B.Sc. (Hons.) in Environmental Science in 2000–2001; and M.Sc. in Environmental Science in 2004. Renamed as the Institute of Forestry and Environmental Sciences, CU (IFESCU), July 1996.

See also

 List of forest research institutes
 List of forestry technical schools
 List of forestry universities and colleges
 List of historic journals of forestry
 Imperial Forestry Institute (disambiguation)

References

Notes

Further reading 
 Fernow, Bernard E. 1913. A brief history of forestry in Europe, the United States and other countries, 3d. ed. Toronto: Toronto University Press; and Washington, DC: American Forestry Association.
 Kuhlberg, Mark. 2009. One Hundred Rings and Counting: Forestry Education and Forestry in Toronto and Canada, 1907-2007. Toronto: University of Toronto Press.
 Shirley, Hardy L. 1958. "Forestry education and research in Russia," Journal of Forestry 56, pp. 892–899.

 
List of historic
 
 
List of historic
Historic schools
Forestry